The Goalkeeper is a 2018 Bolivian thriller film directed by Rodrigo Patiño. It was selected as the Bolivian entry for the Best Foreign Language Film at the 91st Academy Awards, but it was not nominated.

Cast
 Juan Carlos Aduviri as Quispe
 Luis Aduviri as Aparapita
 Erika Andia as Dueña del hostal.
 Fernando Arze as Jorge

See also
 List of submissions to the 91st Academy Awards for Best Foreign Language Film
 List of Bolivian submissions for the Academy Award for Best Foreign Language Film

References

External links
 

2018 films
2018 thriller films
2010s Spanish-language films
Bolivian drama films